Kirsten Greenidge is an American playwright. Her plays are known for their realistic language and focus on social issues such as the intersectionality of race, gender, and class. Her sister is the historian Kerri Greenidge.

Career 
Greenidge has said that she decided she wanted to be a playwright after seeing August Wilson's Joe Turner's Come and Gone at age 12. She attended Wesleyan University and the University of Iowa’s Playwright Workshop. From 2007-2009, she was part of the Huntington Theatre Company's Playwriting Fellows cohort. From 2006-2013, Greenidge was a Resident Playwright at New Dramatists in New York City She is currently Associate Professor at Boston University, teaching playwriting and mentoring undergraduate students. In 2016, Greenidge began a three-year term as the Playwright in Residence at Boston's Company One Theatre through the National Playwright Residency Program, funded by the Andrew W. Mellon Foundation and administered by HowlRound.

Notable works

Milk Like Sugar 
Milk Like Sugar is a coming of age play about 16 year old Annie who makes a pregnancy pact with her friends. As she dreams about having a baby and leading a happy life, she soon learns teen pregnancy is not all it's made to be in her head. The play opened Off-Broadway at Playwrights Horizons Peter Jay Sharp Theatre on October 13, 2011 (previews) and closed on November 27, 2011. It was directed by Rebecca Taichman and starred Tonya Pinkins. The play won a 2012 Obie Awards, Playwriting and Performance, Cherise Boothe and the 2012 Lucille Lortel Award, Outstanding Featured Actress, Tonya Pinkins. Greenidge was partially inspired by news stories in the summer of 2008 about the so-called "pregnancy pact" at Gloucester High School, Massachusetts. The La Jolla Playhouse received the 2011 Round One Edgerton Foundation New Play Awards for Milk Like Sugar.

Luck of the Irish 
Luck of the Irish is about an African American family, whose house was bought by an Irish couple in the 1950s and how to the family’s dismay the deed may have never been properly transferred. The family must now find the deed, convince the couple not to take the house, or risk eviction. The play had its world premiere directed by Melia Bensussen at the Huntington Theatre Company in March 2012. The play was produced Off Broadway at the Lincoln Center Claire Tow Theater from February 2013 to March 10, 2013.

Baltimore 
Greenidge was commissioned the Big Ten Theatre Consortium to write this play in the spring of 2014. After a racial epithet was written on a student's door the entire campus is in social debate about the racial issues taking place in a very contemporary college setting. Issues such as microaggressions, "color blindness" and social segregation are talked about in the play by an ethnically diverse cast. Baltimore was workshopped at the University of Maryland, and then produced in February 2016 at Boston University, in a co-production with New Repertory Theatre and the Boston Center for American Performance.

Critical reception 
The New York Times said Luck of the Irish “feels overburdened and overwritten,” whereas the Chicago Tribune praised it as “riveting and provocative.”

References 

Living people
African-American dramatists and playwrights
Boston University faculty
Year of birth missing (living people)
21st-century American dramatists and playwrights
American women dramatists and playwrights
Wesleyan University alumni
International Writing Program alumni
21st-century American women writers
American women academics
African-American women academics
African-American academics
21st-century African-American women writers
21st-century African-American writers